The 2000 CECAFA Cup was the 24th edition of the football tournament, which involves teams from Southern and Central Africa. The matches were played in Uganda, a decision which Tanzania protested, but to no avail. Tanzania were also banned from international football by FIFA, the world football governing body. The matches were played from 18 November to 2 December 2000. Prior to the tournament, Djibouti withdrew due to monetary difficulties, but re-entered. Sudan and Zanzibar also withdrew, but stayed out. The reasoning behind their withdrawal was unknown.

Nine teams entered the tournament, as opposed to the twelve teams competing at the previous tournament in 1999. However, there were only eight different nations competing in the tournament as Uganda entered two teams: Uganda (A) and Uganda (B). Uganda (A) was in Group A, and Uganda (B) was in Group B, enabling the two the correct set-up to be able to meet each other in the final, as occurred here. Both Ugandas topped their respective groups, and progressed to the knockout stages along with Ethiopia and Rwanda. Uganda (A) beat Rwanda, and Uganda (B) beat Ethiopia to mean that "the Cranes" (Uganda [A]) and "the Lions" (Uganda (B)) would meet in the final. In the final, Uganda (A) captained by George Ssimwogerere of Express, won 2–0. Ethiopia finished third after beating Rwanda on penalties 4–2 after the match finished 0–0.

Background 
The CECAFA Cup is considered Africa's oldest football tournament, and involves teams from Central and Southern Africa. The tournament was originally named the Gossage Cup, contested by the four nations of Kenya, Uganda, Tanganyika (modern day Tanzania), and Zanzibar; it ran from 1929 until 1965. In 1967, this became the East and Central African Senior Challenge Cup, often shortened to simply the Challenge Cup, which was competed for five years, until 1971, before the CECAFA Cup was introduced in 1973. The 1999 champions were Rwanda (B), in 2000 they emerged from their group second, after Uganda (B), 5 points behind but 2 points ahead of the next team, Eritrea. They were then knocked out in the semi-finals against Uganda (A). The 2000 champions, Uganda, were knocked out in the 1999 semi-finals by none other than Rwanda.

Participants 
9 teams from 8 countries competed, three teams from the original tournament competed (excluding Tanganyika, which changed names and is currently called Tanzania), all 8 nations at this tournament had competed at the 1999 CECAFA Cup.

Group stage
The group stage began on 18 November and ended on 27 November with Group A's final match between Ethiopia and Burundi. At the end of the group stage, the teams who finished bottom of their group were eliminated, along with the two teams above them (in Group A), and the team above them (in Group B), whereas the teams positioned in the top two slots in the groups progressed to the knock-out rounds. Due to there being an odd number of teams, Group A contained more matches and an additional team, with a total of 5 to Group B's 4 teams.

If two or more teams are equal on points on completion of the group matches, the following criteria are applied to determine the rankings (in descending order):
 Number of points obtained in games between the teams involved;
 Goal difference in games between the teams involved;
 Goals scored in games between the teams involved;
 Away goals scored in games between the teams involved;
 Goal difference in all games;
 Goals scored in all games;
 Drawing of lots.

Group A
Played in Nakivubo Stadium, Kampala.

Group B

Played in the Municipal Stadium, Mbale.

Knockout stage

Semi-finals

Third place match

Final

Team statistics 
Teams are ranked using the same tie-breaking criteria as in the group stage, except for the top four teams.

References

CECAFA Cup
International association football competitions hosted by Uganda
CEc